Paul Hertzberg (born December 7, 1949) is an American film producer and former actor. His genres included thrillers, action, drama, and sci-fi. He is currently the president and chief executive officer of CineTel Films, Inc. Much like his company's vice president, Lisa M. Hansen, Hertzberg also frequently made cameos in the films he has been involved with.

Career
Hertzberg founded Chicago Teleproductions in 1980 and recruited Hansen a year later. He later moved to Los Angeles in 1983 with her to do sales for the company, which was renamed CineTel Films. Later, during the early 1980s, Hertzberg, along with Hansen, went to Cannes for the first time and attended what would later become MIPCOM. During the festival, the two CineTel executives found themselves with unsalable entertainment shows, with the exception of Hansen's film acquisition The Courier of Death, which sold out quickly. Observing this success, CineTel switched its business focus from television programming to feature film production.

Under Hertzberg's auspices and direct involvement since its founding, CineTel has become one of the leading independent production and distribution companies in the entertainment industry. He said, "From the company's inception, we placed a major emphasis on the creation of quality product at reasonable cost. This has remained central to our company's philosophy and has been directly responsible for our success."

He is a member of the Academy of Motion Picture Arts and Sciences-Producers Division, the Screen Actors Guild, and serves as a consultant to the American Film Marketing Association Publications and Research Committee. He served two terms as Chairman of the Independent Film and Television Alliance.

Filmography

References

External links
 
 The CineTel Films website

American film producers
American male film actors
American male screenwriters
Living people
20th-century American male actors
Place of birth missing (living people)
1949 births